Homi Adajania (born 1972) is an Indian film director and writer. He made his directorial debut with Being Cyrus (2006), an English-language psychological drama. He followed this with the commercially successful Hindi-language romantic comedy Cocktail (2012). After this Adajania directed the satire Finding Fanny.

Career
Adajania entered the film industry directing and co-writing the English-language psychological drama Being Cyrus (2006) starring Saif Ali Khan, Naseeruddin Shah, Dimple Kapadia, and Boman Irani. The film earned critical acclaim, despite being commercially unsuccessful. Film critic Rajeev Masand called it "a stylish thriller that's told in an immensely engaging style."

Adajania's second directorial venture was the Hindi-language romantic comedy Cocktail (2012). The film was written by filmmaker Imtiaz Ali and produced by Saif Ali Khan and Dinesh Vijan under their banner Illuminati Films. The lead roles were played by Khan, Deepika Padukone, and debutante actress Diana Penty, while Kapadia and Boman Irani featured in supporting roles. After its three-week run, Box Office India declared the film a hit in India and abroad. It earned mixed to positive reviews from critics.

Adajania's third directorial venture, the satirical comedy Finding Fanny, was released in September 2014 in both English and Hindi. The film starred an ensemble cast including Shah, Kapadia, Pankaj Kapur, Padukone, and Arjun Kapoor. The film received mostly positive reviews, and had a steady run at the box office.

His next project was a Hindi film, Angrezi Medium, starring Irrfan Khan, Radhika Madan and Deepak Dobriyal which released on March 12 2020.

Personal life

Adajania was born in a Parsi family. His father, Aspy Adajania, was an Indian Army officer and a pioneer of amateur boxing in India who went onto serve as a top administrator of the sport and as a referee officiated high profile matches. Homi lost his sister, Zia Diwan Adajania, to a stroke in 2014.

He is married to fashion stylist and the Fashion Director of Vogue India, Anaita Shroff Adajania and has two children. His sister-in-law, Scherezade Shroff - a well known YouTuber, is married to actor Vaibhav Talwar.

He played in his youth for the Bombay Gymkhana rugby football team in Mumbai. He is a certified CMAS (Confédération Mondiale des Activités Subaquatiques) dive instructor, and used to teach in the Lakshadweep islands.

Filmography

References

External links

 

Living people
Indian male screenwriters
Film directors from Mumbai
Hindi-language film directors
Cathedral and John Connon School alumni
1972 births
Parsi people from Mumbai